Carra may refer to:

People
 Alexis Carra (born 1990), French footballer
 Carlo Carrà (1881–1966), Italian futurist painter
 Claude Carra Saint-Cyr (1760–1834), French general and diplomat
 Gian-Carlo Carra, Canadian municipal politician 
 Gloria Carrá (born 1971), Argentinian actress
  (1742–1793), French activist and politician
 Kevin McCarra (born 1958), Scottish sportswriter
 Lawrence Carra (1909–2006), American drama professor
 Lucille Carra, American documentary film director, producer, and writer
 Raffaella Carrà (1943–2021), Italian entertainer
 Nickname of Jamie Carragher (born 1978), English association footballer

Places
 Carra, County Mayo, an Irish village and barony
 Lough Carra, an Irish lake in County Mayo

See also

 Cara (disambiguation)
 Carras (disambiguation)
 Caragh, a village in County Kildare, Ireland
 Carry (disambiguation)